Malonyl-CoA is a coenzyme A derivative of malonic acid.

Functions
It plays a key role in chain elongation in fatty acid biosynthesis and polyketide biosynthesis.

Fatty acid biosynthesis
Malonyl-CoA provides 2-carbon units to fatty acids and commits them to fatty acid chain synthesis.

Malonyl-CoA is formed by carboxylating acetyl-CoA using the enzyme acetyl-CoA carboxylase. One molecule of acetyl-CoA joins with a molecule of bicarbonate, requiring energy rendered from ATP.

Malonyl-CoA is utilised in fatty acid biosynthesis by the enzyme malonyl coenzyme A:acyl carrier protein transacylase (MCAT). MCAT serves to transfer malonate from malonyl-CoA to the terminal thiol of holo-acyl carrier protein (ACP).

Polyketide biosynthesis
MCAT is also involved in bacterial polyketide biosynthesis.  The enzyme MCAT together with an acyl carrier protein (ACP), and a polyketide synthase (PKS) and chain-length factor heterodimer,  constitutes the minimal PKS of type II polyketides.

Regulation
Malonyl-CoA is a highly regulated molecule in fatty acid synthesis; as such, it inhibits the rate-limiting step in beta-oxidation of fatty acids. Malonyl-CoA inhibits fatty acids from associating with carnitine by regulating the enzyme carnitine acyltransferase, thereby preventing them from entering the mitochondria, where fatty acid oxidation and degradation occur.

See also
Malonyl-CoA decarboxylase
Malonyl-CoA decarboxylase deficiency
MCAT (gene)

References

External links
 Hope for new way to beat obesity

Metabolism
Thioesters of coenzyme A